DeKalb County may refer to one of several counties in the United States, all of which were named for Baron Johan DeKalb:

 DeKalb County, Alabama
 DeKalb County, Georgia
 DeKalb County, Illinois
 DeKalb County, Indiana
 DeKalb County, Missouri
 DeKalb County, Tennessee

See also
DeKalb (disambiguation)